Paul Nelson may refer to:

Paul Nelson (critic) (1936–2006), rock critic who worked for Rolling Stone
Paul R. Nelson (born 1966), 2006 Republican nominee for Wisconsin's 3rd congressional district
Paul Nelson (composer) (1929–2008), American musician and composer
Paul Nelson (creationist) (born 1958), philosopher of science and Intelligent Design advocate
Paul Nelson (musician), guitarist with Liege Lord and Johnny Winter
Paul Nelson (South Dakota politician), member of the South Dakota State House of Representatives
Paul Nelson (architect), French architect